A Cocktail party is a party where cocktails are served.

Cocktail party may also refer to:
Cocktail party effect, the ability to pay attention to one conversation among many
Cocktail party problem, the digital signal processing application of the cocktail party effect
The Cocktail Party, a play by T. S. Eliot

See also
The Longest Cocktail Party, 1973 book about the Beatles
The World's Largest Outdoor Cocktail Party, annual American Florida–Georgia college football game
Cocktail (disambiguation)